Ćukovi (Serbian Cyrillic: Ћукови) is a village in the municipality of Bihać, Bosnia and Herzegovina.

Demographics 
According to the 2013 census, its population was 221.

See also 
 Kulen Vakuf massacre

References

Populated places in Bihać